James Harlee Bell (December 1, 1891 – October 26, 1973) was an American film and stage actor who appeared in about 150 films and television shows through 1964.

Bell was born in Suffolk, Virginia, and graduated from Virginia Polytechnic Institute in 1911 with a degree in electrical engineering. In 1920, he made his theatrical debut as Venustiano in The Bad Man. He worked steadily on Broadway through 1941.

Bell's first film role was in I Am a Fugitive from a Chain Gang in 1932. He appeared in the films I Walked with a Zombie and The Leopard Man, both of which were directed by Jacques Tourneur, produced by Val Lewton, and released in 1943.

Among his television appearances were four guest roles on the legal drama series Perry Mason. In 1958, he played murder victim J.J. Stanley in the episode "The Case of the Green-Eyed Sister", and murderer P.E. Overbrook in "The Case of the Lazy Lover." In 1960, he played murderer Zack Davis in "The Case of the Frantic Flyer", and murder victim Silas Vance in "The Case of the Lavender Lipstick". That same year, Bell appeared as Dr. Malcolm Allen in the Western TV series Laramie, in the episode "Street of Hate".

Broadway roles
 The Bad Man (1920) as Venustiano
 A Free Soul (1928) as Bill Wilfong
 Jarnegan (1928) as Jimmy Fallon
 Your Uncle Dudley (1933) as Robert Kirby
 Thunder on the Left (1933) as Martin
 The Last Mile (1930) as Richard Walters
 Kill That Story (1934) as Duke Devlin
 Tobacco Row as Lester

Selected filmography

 I Am a Fugitive from a Chain Gang (1932) - Red (uncredited)
 The Monkey's Paw (1933) - Flute Player (uncredited)
 The King's Vacation (1933) - Anderson
 Infernal Machine (1933) - Spencer
 Private Detective 62 (1933) - Whitey
 Storm at Daybreak (1933) - Peter (uncredited)
 Day of Reckoning (1933) - Slim
 White Woman (1933) - Hambly
 Student Tour (1934) - Indian Fakir (uncredited)
 The Lives of a Bengal Lancer (1935) - Indian Officer (uncredited)
 Holiday Inn (1942) - Dunbar
 I Walked with a Zombie (1943) - Dr. Maxwell
 The Leopard Man (1943) - Dr. Galbraith
 My Friend Flicka (1943) - Gus
 So Proudly We Hail! (1943) - Col. White
 Gangway for Tomorrow (1943) - Tom Burke
 I Love a Soldier (1944) - Williams
 Thunderhead, Son of Flicka (1945) - Gus
 Blood on the Sun (1945) - Charley Sprague
 The Girl of the Limberlost (1945) - Wesley Sinton
 The Spiral Staircase (1946) - Constable
 The Unknown (1946) - Edward Martin
 Dead Reckoning (1947) - Father Logan
 Blind Spot (1947) - Det. Lt. Fred Applegate
 The Sea of Grass (1947) - Sam Hall
 The Millerson Case (1947) - Ezra Minnich
 Brute Force (1947) - Crenshaw - Convict in Print Shop
 The Romance of Rosy Ridge (1947) - John Willhart
 Philo Vance's Secret Mission (1947) - Sheriff Harry Madison
 Driftwood (1947) - Sheriff Bolton
 Killer McCoy (1947) - Father Patrick Ryan
 I, Jane Doe (1948) - Judge Bertrand
 Black Eagle (1948) - Frank Hayden
 Sealed Verdict (1948) - Mr. Hockland
 Roughshod (1949) - Pa (Ed) Wyatt
 Streets of Laredo (1949) - Ike
 Dial 1119 (1950) - Harrison D. Barnes
 The Company She Keeps (1951) - Mr. Neeley
 Buckaroo Sheriff of Texas (1951) - Sheriff Tom White
 The Dakota Kid (1951) - Sheriff Tom White
 Flying Leathernecks (1951) - Colonel
 Arizona Manhunt (1951) - Sheriff Tom White
 Red Mountain (1951) - Dr. Terry
 Japanese War Bride (1952) - Ed Sterling
 Wild Horse Ambush (1952) - Sheriff Tom White
 Ride the Man Down (1952) - John Evarts
 Million Dollar Mermaid (1952) - Judge
 Hannah Lee: An American Primitive (1953) - Man at Carousel in Prologue (uncredited)
 The Last Posse (1953) - Will Romer
 Devil's Canyon (1953) - Dr. Betts
 Crime Wave (1953) - Daniel O'Keefe
 All the Brothers Were Valiant (1953) - Aaron Burnham
 The Glenn Miller Story (1954) - Mr. Burger
 Riding Shotgun (1954) - Doc Winkler
 About Mrs. Leslie (1954) - Mr. Herbert Poole
 Black Tuesday (1954) - John Norris
 Strategic Air Command (1955) - Rev. Dr. Thorne
 Marty (1955) - Mr. Snyder (uncredited)
 Lay That Rifle Down (1955) - Mr. Fetcher
 Sincerely Yours (1955) - Grandfather Hunt
 Texas Lady (1955) - Cass Gower
 A Lawless Street (1955) - Asaph Dean
 Tribute to a Bad Man (1956) - L.A. Peterson
 A Day of Fury (1956) - Doc Logan
 Huk! (1956) - Stephen Rogers
 The Search for Bridey Murphy (1956) - Hugh Lynn Cayce
 Four Girls in Town (1957) - Walter Conway
 The Lonely Man (1957) - Judge Hart
 Back from the Dead (1957) - Mr. Bradley
 Johnny Trouble (1957) - Reverend Harrington
 The Tin Star (1957) - Judge Thatcher
 In Love and War (1958) - Sidney Lenaine (uncredited)
 The Trap (1959) - Sourdough (uncredited)
 The Oregon Trail (1959) - Jeremiah Cooper
 -30- (1959) - Ben Quinn
 Posse from Hell (1961) - Benson
 Claudelle Inglish (1961) - Josh
 Bonanza (1962, Episode: "The Jury") - Hjalmer Olson
 The Virginian (1963 episode "To Make This Place Remember") - Dr. David T. Harvey
 Twilight of Honor (1963) - Charles Crispin
 Where Love Has Gone (1964) - Judge - Divorce Court (uncredited) (final film role)

References

External links 

 
 
 
 Bell, Joyce Arling. Pumpernickel and champagne : a biography of James Harllee Bell. Kents Store, Va.: J.A. Bell, 1973. Print.

1891 births
1973 deaths
20th-century American male actors
American male film actors
American male stage actors
Virginia Tech alumni
Actors from Virginia